The 1970–71 English football season was Aston Villa's 71st season in the Football League, this season playing in the Third Division. Vic Crowe was manager.

Third Division

Appearances
1 John Dunn
2 Keith Bradley
3 Charlie Aitken
4 Brian Godfrey (c)
5 Fred Turnbull
6 Brian Tiler
7 Pat McMahon
8 Bruce Rioch
9 Andy Lochhead
10 Ian Hamilton
11 Willie Anderson
12 Dave Gibson

Notes

References

External links
AVFC History: 1970-71 season

Aston Villa F.C. seasons
Aston Villa F.C. season